Jean-Paul Virapoullé (born 15 March 1944 in Bras-Panon, Réunion) is a member of the Senate of France, representing the island of Réunion.

Virapoullé is a member of the Union for a Popular Movement. A wealthy sugar cane farmer of the Malbar group, he is known as a traditional opponent of the Communist Party of Réunion.

References
Page on the Senate website

1944 births
Living people
French Senators of the Fifth Republic
Mayors of places in Réunion
Réunionnais people of Indian descent
People of Tamil descent from Réunion
The Republicans (France) politicians
Union of Democrats and Independents politicians
Senators of Réunion
Recipients of Pravasi Bharatiya Samman